The alar plate (or alar lamina) is a neural structure in the embryonic nervous system, part of the dorsal side of neural tube, that involves the communication of general somatic and general visceral sensory impulses. The caudal part later becomes sensory axon part of the spinal cord.

The alar plate specifically later on becomes the dorsal gray of the spinal cord, and develops into the sensory nuclei of cranial nerves V, VII, VIII, IX, and X.  The inferior olivary nucleus, mesencephalic nucleus of V, and main sensory nucleus of V are also developed from this plate. Also from the rhombic lip of the alar plate develops the cerebellum, which is considered to be a big exception since alar plate gives rise to sensory derivatives only.

See also
 Basal plate

References

External links
 BrainInfo
 Overview at temple.edu

Embryology of nervous system